Charles H. Weeks (1837 – ?) was an American soldier who fought in the Union Navy aboard the USS Montauk during the American Civil War. He was awarded the Medal of Honor which awarded to him for actions as a captain of the foretop off Port Royal, South Carolina on 21 September 1864.

Medal of Honor citation

References 

1837 births
Date of death unknown
American Civil War recipients of the Medal of Honor
Union Navy personnel